The 2022 US Open was the 142nd edition of tennis' US Open and the fourth and final tennis major (Grand Slam event) of the year. It was held on outdoor hard courts at the USTA Billie Jean King National Tennis Center in New York City.

Daniil Medvedev and Emma Raducanu were the men's and women's singles defending tournament champions. Raducanu lost to Alizé Cornet in the first round, while Medvedev lost to Nick Kyrgios in the fourth round.

Carlos Alcaraz and Iga Świątek won the men's and women's singles titles, respectively. They became the first players, both born in the 2000s, to win the tournament's singles titles.

Tournament
The 2022 US Open was the 142nd consecutive edition of the tournament and took place at the USTA Billie Jean King National Tennis Center in Flushing Meadows–Corona Park of Queens in New York City, New York, United States. The tournament was played on hard courts and took place over a series of 15 courts with Laykold surface, including the three existing main showcourts – Arthur Ashe Stadium, Louis Armstrong Stadium and Grandstand.

The tournament was run by the United States Tennis Association (USTA), supervised by the International Tennis Federation (ITF), and part of the 2022 ATP Tour (male tennis professionals) and the 2022 WTA Tour (female professional players) calendars under the Grand Slam category. The tournament consisted of both men's and women's singles and doubles draws, as singles draws remained in standard 128 person format in each category, as both doubles draws returned to standard 64 players. There were also singles and doubles events for both boys and girls (players under 18), which were part of the Grade A category of tournaments.

This was the first time at any tennis major that coaching was allowed from the stands.

Broadcast
In the United States, the 2022 US Open was the eighth year in a row under an 11-year, $825 million contract with ESPN, in which the broadcaster held exclusive rights to the entire tournament and the US Open Series. This meant that the tournament was not available on broadcast television.

All tournament matches not cablecasted by ESPN, which focuses almost exclusively on the singles competitions, were available online on ESPN+.

Singles players 
 Men's singles

 Women's singles

Events

Men's singles

  Carlos Alcaraz def.  Casper Ruud, 6–4, 2–6, 7–6(7–1), 6–3

Women's singles

  Iga Świątek def.  Ons Jabeur, 6–2, 7–6(7–5)

Men's doubles

  Rajeev Ram /  Joe Salisbury def.  Wesley Koolhof /  Neal Skupski, 7–6(7–4), 7–5

Women's doubles

  Barbora Krejčiková /  Kateřina Siniaková def.  Caty McNally /  Taylor Townsend, 3–6, 7–5, 6–1

Mixed doubles

  Storm Sanders /  John Peers def.  Kirsten Flipkens /  Édouard Roger-Vasselin, 4–6, 6–4, [10–7]

Wheelchair men's singles

  Alfie Hewett def.  Shingo Kunieda, 7–6(7–2), 6–1

Wheelchair women's singles

  Diede de Groot def.  Yui Kamiji, 3–6, 6–1, 6–1

Wheelchair quad singles

  Niels Vink def.  Sam Schröder, 7–5, 6–3

Wheelchair men's doubles

  Martín de la Puente /  Nicolas Peifer def.  Alfie Hewett /  Gordon Reid, 4–6, 7–5, [10–6]

Wheelchair women's doubles

  Diede de Groot /  Aniek van Koot def.  Yui Kamiji /  Kgothatso Montjane, 6–2, 6–2

Wheelchair quad doubles

 Sam Schröder /  Niels Vink def.  Robert Shaw /  David Wagner, 6–1, 6–2

Boys' singles

  Martín Landaluce def.  Gilles-Arnaud Bailly, 7–6(7–3), 5–7, 6–2

Girls' singles

  Alex Eala def.  Lucie Havlíčková, 6–2, 6–4

Boys' doubles

   Ozan Baris /  Nishesh Basavareddy def.  Dylan Dietrich /  Juan Carlos Prado Ángelo, 6–1, 6–1

Girls' doubles

  Lucie Havlíčková /  Diana Shnaider def.  Carolina Kuhl /  Ella Seidel, 6–3, 6–2

Wheelchair boys' singles

 Ben Bartram  def.  Dahnon Ward, 6–4, 6–1

Wheelchair girls' singles

  Jade Moreira Lanai def.  Yuma Takamuro, 7–5, 2–6, 7–6[10–5]

Wheelchair boys' doubles

   Ben Bartram /  Dahnon Ward def.  Ivar van Rijt /  Saalim Naser, 6–4, 6–3

Wheelchair girls' doubles

  Jade Moreira Lanai /  Maylee Phelps def.  Lily Lautenschlager /  Ruby Bishop, 6–0, 6–0

Point and prize money distribution

Point distribution
Below is a series of tables for each competition showing each event's ranking points on offer.

Wheelchair

Junior

Prize money 
The total prize money for the 2022 US Open topped $60 million ($60,102,000) for the first time, 4.59% more than the 2021 edition and maintained the tournament's status as having the richest prize purse of all Grand Slams.

Tennis Plays for Peace exhibition 
On August 10, the tournament announced it would host an exhibition to support Ukraine during the Russian invasion. The exhibition matches took place on August 24, with all proceeds going to GlobalGiving, the international non-profit identified by Tennis Plays for Peace. Brothers John and Patrick McEnroe hosted and served as chair umpires, with John playing one match. The exhibition raised US$1.2 million in proceeds.

The matches, all of which were played by a first-to-ten-points basis, were as follows:
  Iga Świątek /  Rafael Nadal def.  Coco Gauff /  John McEnroe, [10–8]
  Jessica Pegula /  Ben Shelton def.  Leylah Fernandez /  Félix Auger-Aliassime, [10–8]
  Maria Sakkari /  Stefanos Tsitsipas def.  Katarina Zavatska /  Matteo Berrettini, [10–7]
  Taylor Fritz /  Tommy Paul def.  Carlos Alcaraz /  Frances Tiafoe, [10–9]
  Dayana Yastremska /  Frances Tiafoe def.  Daria Snigur /  Sebastian Korda, [10–4]

Victoria Azarenka of Belarus was also scheduled to attend, but the tournament later disinvited her for her country's support of Russia, in addition to having received objections from Ukrainian players.

References

External links

 

 
2022 ATP Tour
2022 in tennis
2022 US Open (tennis)
2022 WTA Tour
2022
August 2022 sports events in the United States
September 2022 sports events in the United States
2022 in American tennis
2022 in sports in New York City